The discography of American Grammy-nominated songwriter, multi-instrumentalist, and producer Cory Wong which consists of 14 studio albums (ten solo albums, three with The Fearless Flyers, and one with Cory Wong Quartet), four collaboration albums, one EP, eight live albums, 31 singles (26 as a lead artist and five as a featured artist), and over 60 other appearances.

Albums

Studio albums

Solo albums

Cory Wong Quartet

The Fearless Flyers

Collaborations

Live albums

Extended plays

Singles

As lead artist

As featured artist

Production and songwriting
These are writing and production credits for music outside of Cory Wong's own solo work.

Other appearances

Notes

References

External links
Official site

Discographies of American artists
Jazz discographies
Funk music discographies